Linwood High School is a non-denominational comprehensive state secondary school in Linwood, Renfrewshire, Scotland.

The original school building was constructed in 1965 and demolished in 2006 for a new school to be constructed on the same site.

Originally Renfrewshire council had planned on merging Linwood High school with nearby Gryffe High School in Houston to form a 1500 pupil campus, but plans were rejected after local protests by parents. The councillors are reported to have received over 2600 responses, mostly opposing the plan.

The new school was part of Renfrewshire Council's £100 million Private Public Partnership (PPP) agreement, with Amey / Carillion Building being announced as preferred bidder in March 2005.

The £11.1 million construction was fully completed with the official opening in April 2008 by Fiona Hyslop, Cabinet Secretary for Education and Lifelong Learning.

In 2008, the school was one of four in the Renfrewshire area to have a Strathclyde Police officer on the premises with the key aim of "building stronger and safer communities".  Strathclyde Police stated that the schools were chosen "because they are the ones with the biggest intake and catchment areas in Renfrewshire"

Roll
2004/2005 – 516 pupils
 2008/2009 – 467 pupils
 2010/2011 – 444 pupils

Head Teachers

 1965 – 1975 Bob Curtis
 1975 – 1995 Iain Clark
 1995 – 2009 Keith Hasson
 2009–2017 Eileen Young
 2017–present Gillian Macartney

Notable former pupils

 Drew Wilson Triple Commonwealth Games cyclist
 Paul Lambert Captain: Celtic Football Club
 Darryl Duffy Hibernian Football Club
 David Lowing St Mirren Football Club
 Steven McDougall Dumfermline Football Club
 Paul Paton Partick Thistle Football Club

HMie Report
In September 2005 HMIe visited the school and highlighted areas for improvement within the school. A follow up inspection in September 2007 indicated that the issues raised had been adequately addressed.

References

External links
Official page
Linwood High School's page on Scottish Schools Online
Renfrewshire Community Website – Linwood High School
HMIe: HM Inspectorate of Education

Secondary schools in Renfrewshire
Educational institutions established in 1965
1965 establishments in Scotland